Agrotis alluaudi is a moth of the family Noctuidae. It is found in Réunion. The male adults of this species have large, bipectinated antennaes.

References

External links
 Lépidoptères de La Réunion: Pictures of Agrotis alluaudi

Agrotis
Moths described in 1958
Moths of Africa